FXT may refer to:
 FreeX FXT, a German paraglider
 Functional XML Transformation Tool